Guayana Province (1585−1864) was a former province of Spanish Colonial Venezuela and independent Venezuela, located in the Guyana region of northeastern South America.

The province was part of the Spanish colonial New Andalusia Province and Captaincy General of Venezuela from 1585 to 1821, and of independent Venezuela from 1821 to 1864.

History
Guayana Province covered a territory roughly equal to the present day country of Guyana and the Venezuelan Guayana Region from 1591 to 1739, when the province's territory was merged into the Spanish Trinidad-Guayana Province, along with Trinidad Province (present day Trinidad and Tobago).

Amazonas is named after the Amazon River, and was formerly part of the Spanish Viceroyalty of Peru, a region called Spanish Guyana. It was settled by the Portuguese in the early 18th century and incorporated into the Portuguese empire after the Treaty of Madrid in 1750. It became a state of the Brazilian Republic in 1889.

Guayana Province was within the Spanish colonial New Andalusia Province from its establishment in 1585 to 1776, when it was incorporated into the new Captaincy General of Venezuela. It was also within the larger jurisdiction of the Viceroyalty of New Granada (1717–1819).

After the Venezuelan War of Independence (1811–1823) it was a province in new nation of Venezuela until 1864.

Maps

See also
History of Guyana
Colonial Venezuela
Governorate of New Andalusia (1501–13) 
New Andalusia Province (1537–1864) 
Captaincy General of Venezuela (1777–1823)

The Guianas
Colonial Venezuela
Provinces of the Spanish Empire
Former colonies in South America
History of Guyana
Spanish period of Trinidad and Tobago
History of Venezuela
Provinces of Venezuela
Geography of Bolívar (state)
Viceroyalty of New Granada
States and territories established in 1585
States and territories disestablished in 1821
States and territories disestablished in 1864
1585 establishments in South America
1864 disestablishments in South America
1585 establishments in the Spanish Empire
1821 disestablishments in the Spanish Empire
16th-century establishments in Venezuela
1820s disestablishments in Venezuela
1820s establishments in Venezuela
1860s disestablishments in Venezuela